Presbyterian Healthcare Services is a private not-for-profit health care system and health care provider in the State of New Mexico. It owns and operates 8 hospitals in 7 New Mexico communities. It also operates Presbyterian Health Plan.

History

In 1908, Rev. Hugh A. Cooper, a Presbyterian pastor in Albuquerque founded the Southwest Presbyterian Sanatorium, a facility  for the hundreds of tuberculosis patients coming to Albuquerque. By 1950, with tuberculosis under control,  its future became in doubt. The board of directors hired a professional hospital administrator to help manage the institution.  A new administrator brought a new focus, and a new name: The Presbyterian Hospital Center.
Presbyterian Healthcare Services also named its administration center as the Rev. Hugh A Cooper Administration Center after its founder. This building located near the Albuquerque International Balloon Fiesta Park, houses the executives of the organization as well as 2,500+ permanent and contracted employees with a daily visitation of up to 3,500+ employees, patients, contractors and customers at its administration center.

Presbyterian Healthcare Services has grown since its founding in 1908 to include a system of 9 hospitals, a multi-specialty medical group with more than 900 providers, and a statewide health plan. The broad system serves approximately one third of all New Mexicans with either healthcare services or the healthcare insurance plan. In 2022, the New Mexico Hospital Association selected four of the PHS healthcare facilities for awards: Lincoln County Medical Center, Socorro General Hospital, Presbyterian Kaseman, and Presbyterian Rust.

The Presbyterian Hospital Center  grew through the 1960s and 1970s: Kaseman Hospital, a satellite facility in northeastern Albuquerque opened, the state's first HMO health plan was established, a statewide multi-hospital system was formed. The Presbyterian Hospital Center was renamed  Southwestern Community Health Services, and finally the present Presbyterian Hospital

Hospitals

Presbyterian Downtown Hospital Albuquerque (453 beds)
Presbyterian–Kaseman Hospital Albuquerque
Plains Regional Medical Center Clovis (106 beds)
Presbyterian–Espanola Hospital Espanola (80 beds)
Presbyterian–Rust Medical Center Rio Rancho (162 beds)
Lincoln County Medical Center Ruidoso (39 beds)
Socorro General Hospital Socorro (25 beds)
Dan C. Trigg Memorial Hospital Tucumcari (25 beds)
Presbyterian Santa Fe Medical Center Santa Fe (30 beds)

References

External links
Presbyterian Hospital and Health Plan

Hospital networks in the United States
Health care companies established in 1908
Presbyterian Church (USA)
1908 establishments in New Mexico Territory
Medical and health organizations based in New Mexico
Healthcare in New Mexico
American companies established in 1908